Flynn is an unincorporated community in Leon County, Texas, United States. According to the Handbook of Texas, the community had an estimated population of 81 in 2000.

References

External links
 

Unincorporated communities in Leon County, Texas
Unincorporated communities in Texas